Brian Daniels (born October 2, 1958) is a Minnesotan politician serving in the Minnesota House of Representatives since 2015. A member of the Republican Party of Minnesota, Daniels represents District 19A south of the Twin Cities metropolitan area, including the city of Faribault and portions of Goodhue, Rice, and Waseca counties.

Early life, education and career
Daniels studied at Northwest Technical College, getting a degree in small business management. His occupation when first elected was warranty administrator.

Minnesota House of Representatives 
Daniels was first elected to the Minnesota House of Representatives in 2014, defeating incumbent Patti Fritz by 221 votes, and has been reelected every two years since.

Daniels serves as the minority lead on the Children and Families Finance and Policy Committee, and also sits on the Labor and Industry Finance and Policy Committee.

Electoral history

Personal life 
Daniels and his wife, Elizabeth, have four children and reside in Faribault, Minnesota. His sister, Marion O'Niell, also serves in the Minnesota House of Representatives, representing District 29B.

References

External links

Rep. Brian Daniels official Minnesota House of Representatives website

1958 births
Living people
Republican Party members of the Minnesota House of Representatives
People from Faribault, Minnesota
21st-century American politicians